Periodic elections for the Tasmanian Legislative Council were held on 1 May 2021. The three seats that were up for election are Derwent, Mersey and Windermere. They were last contested in 2015. Only two of the three seats were actually contested, as the incumbent candidate for Mersey, Mike Gaffney, was returned unopposed.

The periodic elections coincided with the snap general election for the House of Assembly.

Derwent
The seat of Derwent has been held by Labor member Craig Farrell since 2011, when he won the seat in a by-election triggered by the resignation of Michael Aird. Farrell has been President of the Tasmanian Legislative Council since May 2019.

Mersey
The seat of Mersey was held by the independent Mike Gaffney, first elected in 2009. Gaffney was the only candidate to nominate, and was declared elected unopposed on 1 April 2021.

Windermere
The seat of Windermere was held by the independent Ivan Dean from 2003. Dean retired at this election. The seat was won by Liberal candidate Nick Duigan.

References

Tasmanian Legislative Council
Tasmanian